Mark Davies (born Anthony Mark Davies, 4 October 1980) is an English former first-class cricketer who played for Durham County Cricket Club and, briefly, Kent County Cricket Club. He bowled right-arm medium-pace and batted in the tail.

In December 2009, he was called up from the England Lions into the full England squad, to cover for injuries to other bowlers during the tour of South Africa. Davies suffered many injuries during his career. In September 2014, he was forced to retire from all forms of cricket after failing to recover from a shoulder injury picked up in a pre-season fixture.

County career
Born in Stockton-on-Tees, County Durham, England, Davies made his List A debut in 1998, and his first-class debut in 2002. He has represented England under-19s.

His career has been blighted by injury, "especially in 2004 and 2005 when he was taking wickets for fun (50 at 18.76 and 47 at 15.55 respectively)."

He rarely played in 2006, as recurring back problems left him in a "body brace" for three months, but made a comeback in 2007, including a one-month spell on loan to Nottinghamshire, playing one first-class game. In the 2008 season, he played regularly for Durham in the early season and, returning to the side after two months on the sidelines in August 2008 after Steve Harmison was called up for England, Davies took career-best figures of 8–24 versus Hampshire, at Basingstoke as Hampshire were dismissed for just 96. He took 3–51 in the second innings, 11–75 in all, but could not prevent his side from losing.

He joined Kent in 2012. In his first season with the county, he won the player of the year. 2013 was a different proposition altogether for Davies as he found himself left out for much of Kent's season. Despite that, he claimed 25 County Championship wickets. This was the fourth best in the squad, despite having missed 6 games.

Davies retired from cricket in 2014, due to a shoulder injury.

Career-best performances
as of 20 May 2017

Personal life
His brother, Andrew, is a professional footballer who has played for clubs such as Middlesbrough, Bradford City and Ross County FC.

External links

References

1980 births
Living people
Durham cricketers
English cricketers
Cricketers from Stockton-on-Tees
Durham Cricket Board cricketers
Nottinghamshire cricketers
Kent cricketers
Cricketers from Yorkshire